Major General Sir John Emilius Laurie, 6th Baronet,  (12 August 1892 − 10 January 1983) was a British Army officer.

Military career
Educated at Eton and Royal Military College, Sandhurst, Laurie was commissioned into the Seaforth Highlanders in 1912. Serving in the First World War in France, he was awarded the Distinguished Service Order (DSO) in 1916, the citation for which reads:

He was awarded a second medal bar to his DSO in 1918, when an acting lieutenant colonel commanding the 6th Battalion, Seaforth Highlanders. The bar's citation reads:

Between the wars, he became commanding officer of the 2nd Battalion, Seaforth Highlanders in 1934, commanding officer of the British troops in the Tientsin area of China in 1939 and commander of the 157th Brigade in 1940. He was sent to France with the 52nd (Lowland) Division in June 1940, and was appointed a commander of the Order of the British Empire (CBE) for his services. Laurie was appointed General Officer Commanding of that division in March 1941 before becoming Commandant of the Combined Operations Training Centre at Inveraray in 1942. He retired from the British Army as a  major general in 1945.

Laurie served as colonel of the Seaforth Highlanders from 1947 to 1957.

References

Bibliography

External links
Generals of World War II

|-

|-

1892 births
1983 deaths
British Army major generals
British Army generals of World War II
British Army personnel of World War I
Commanders of the Order of the British Empire
Companions of the Distinguished Service Order
Baronets in the Baronetage of the United Kingdom
Graduates of the Royal Military College, Sandhurst
People educated at Eton College
Seaforth Highlanders officers
Military personnel from Hertfordshire